Min Saw Hla (1532–1564) was king of Arakan from 1556 to 1564. At accession, he made his first wife Saw Bon-Htut the chief queen but also married his father's chief queen Saw Thanda. He ordered a massive building program which built and repaired dams, irrigation canals as well as improved the defenses of Mrauk-U and other key towns around the kingdom. In 1561, he commissioned the building of Htukkanthein Temple.

He tightened control of Chittagong and the kingdom's northern perimeter. In the early 1560s, he sent the army to Tripura, whose ruler, according to Arakanese chronicles, submitted to Mrauk-U. He died in 1564 after a long illness. He had chosen his half-brother Min Sekkya to succeed him, and married Sekkya to his own full sister Dhamma Dewi.

Notes

References

Bibliography
 
 

Monarchs of Mrauk-U
1532 births
1564 deaths
16th century in the Mrauk-U Kingdom
16th-century Burmese monarchs